Ragnhild Grågås (died 1510) was a 15th century resident of Stockholm, Sweden. 
She was the person after whom Gåsgränd in Gamla stan was named.

History
Grågås was the centre of a court case. On 23 June 1477, she and her daughter were accused by Sigrid, the wife of Jens Bok, of having had sexual intercourse with her husband. This was regarded as indirect incest according to contemporary law and was a serious crime punishable by death. The court, however, dismissed the charges, as Grågås and her daughter had already previously been accused of the same crime, and already been acquitted of it. Instead, Sigrid was sentenced to banishment from the capital for slander. The sentence was revoked after Grågås and her daughter asked for mercy for Sigrid.

Grågås's will is known from 1513, and she is regarded to have died a few years prior. Grågås's spouse owned property at Gåsgränd, which she later came to own herself. The case against Grågås apparently attracted a lot of attention in contemporary Stockholm, and the location was already called Gåsgränd prior her death.

See also
   Gåstorget

References

Other Sources
Lisbet Scheutz (2001 (2003) nuytgåva). Berömda och glömda stockholmskvinnor: sju stadsvandringar: 155 kvinnoporträtt. Stockholm: MBM.  Libris 8392583
 Ragnhild Grågås var en ärbar kvinna 
 Wrangel, Fredrik Ulrik: Stockholmiana (1912)

15th-century Swedish people
1510 deaths
Year of birth unknown
15th-century Swedish women
16th-century Swedish people
16th-century Swedish women